The racquetball events of World Games I were held on August 1–2, 1981, at the Decathlon Club in Santa Clara, California, in the United States. These were the first World Games, an international quadrennial multi-sport event, and were hosted by the city of Santa Clara. This racquetball competition also served as the first Racquetball World Championships tournament in the sport of racquetball. In addition to the five nations mentioned below, athletes from Japan also participated in the competition.

Medalists
Sources:

Details

Men

Singles

Finals – Ed Andrews, USA, d. Mark Martino, USA, 21-19, 21-5; Martin Padilla, Mexico, d. Larry Fox, USA, 21-6, 18-21, 15-14.

Gold, Andrews. Silver, Martino. Bronze, Padilla.

Double

Finals – Mark Malowitz–Jeff Kwartler, USA, d. Raul Canales–Federico Alvarez, Mexico, 21-7, 18-21, 15-1; Tony Luyckx–Frits Groenendyk, Netherlands, d. William Wenzel–Jorg Harnold, West Germany, 21-6, 21-19.

Gold, Malowitz–Kwartler.  Silver, Canales–Alvarez.  Bronze, Luyckx–Groenendyk.

Men's Teams:

USA Team Members: Ed Andrews (#1 Singles), Larry Fox (#2 Singles), Mark Martino (#3 Singles), Jeff Kwartler/Mark Malowitz (Doubles), Scott Schafer (Alternate Singles 1), Jack Newman (Alternate Singles 2)

Women

Single

Finals – Cindy Baxter, USA, d. Barbara Faulkenberry, USA, 21-6, 18-21, 15-2; Betsy Massie, USA, d. Mirjam Wielhassen, Netherlands, 21-10, 21-2.

Gold, Baxter. Silver, Faulkenberry. Bronze, Massie.

Double

Finals – Karen Borga–Mary Ann Cluess, USA, d. Mirjam Wielhassen–Dineke Kool, Netherlands, 21-13, 21-9; Susan Martinez–Armida Suarez, Mexico, d. Catherine Donegan–Mavis O'Toole, Ireland, 21-5, 21-1.

Gold, Borga–Cluess.  Silver, Wielhassen–Kool.  Bronze, Martinez–Suarez.

References

1981
1981 World Games
1981 in racquetball
Racquetball in the United States
1981